Lakes Region Free Press is a newspaper based in Granville, NY, published weekly on Thursdays. The newspaper covers Poultney, VT and surrounding communities in Western Rutland County, Vermont, and the Lakes Region of western Vermont and eastern New York state. The paper is owned by Manchester Newspapers Inc., and the circulation is estimated to be around 7,400. Manchester Newspapers Inc. is a member of the Vermont Lakes Region Chamber of Commerce. The Lakes Region Free Press is the newspaper of record for the town of New Haven, Castleton, and Pawlet, Vermont. The editor is John Manchester.

References

External links 
 Website

Free newspapers
Newspapers published in New York (state)
Weekly newspapers published in the United States